General elections were held in Ghana on 7 December 2000, with a second round of the presidential election on 28 December. 

In the presidential election, John Kufuor of the New Patriotic Party (NPP) led the field in the first round of voting, taking 48 percent of the vote. Vice President John Atta Mills of the National Democratic Congress (NDC) finished second, with 44 percent. Kufuor defeated Atta-Mills in the second round with 57 percent of the vote. The NPP also won the most seats in the parliamentary elections, ending eight years of NDC dominance. However, with 99 of the 200 seats, it was two seats short of a majority.

The elections marked the first peaceful transfer of power via the ballot box in the country's history.

Results

President

Parliament

The vacant seat was filled by a by-election on 3 January 2001 and won by the NPP.

See also
List of Ghana Parliament constituencies
List of MPs elected in the 2000 Ghanaian parliamentary election

References

External links
Ghana: Parliamentary Chamber: Parliament: Elections held in 2000 Inter-Parliamentary Union

Elections in Ghana
Ghana
General
Presidential elections in Ghana